Pheia bisigna is a moth in the subfamily Arctiinae. It was described by William James Kaye in 1911. It is found in Guyana.

References

Moths described in 1911
bisigna